Oak's Inn Military Reservation was a coastal defense site located in Misquamicut, Rhode Island in the town of Westerly, overlooking Misquamicut State Beach. It was part of the Harbor Defenses of Long Island Sound. Today, the site is a residential development.

History
Oak's Inn Military Reservation was built adjacent to the inn of the same name in 1942. The site had four "Panama mounts" (circular concrete platforms) for four towed 155 mm (6.1 inch) guns. A battery of two 16-inch (406 mm) guns (Battery Construction Number 114) was proposed for this location but not built. The reservation was deactivated in 1944.

Present
The site and the adjacent inn of the same name were demolished for residential development by the 2000s, with no remaining structures.

See also
 Seacoast defense in the United States
 United States Army Coast Artillery Corps

References

External links
 List of all US coastal forts and batteries at the Coast Defense Study Group, Inc. website
 FortWiki, lists most CONUS and Canadian forts
 Harbor Defenses of Long Island Sound at American Forts Network

Forts in Rhode Island
Westerly, Rhode Island
Buildings and structures in Washington County, Rhode Island
Demolished buildings and structures in Rhode Island